The 2002 Appalachian State Mountaineers football team represented Appalachian State University as a member of the Southern Conference (SoCon) during the 2002 NCAA Division I-AA football  season. Led by 14th-year head coach Jerry Moore, the Mountaineers compiled an overall record of 8–4 with a mark of 6–2 in conference play, tying for second place in the SoCon. Appalachian State advanced to the NCAA Division I-AA Football Championship playoffs, where they lost to Maine in the first round. The Mountaineers played their home games at Kidd Brewer Stadium in Boone, North Carolina.

Schedule

References

Appalachian State
Appalachian State Mountaineers football seasons
Appalachian State Mountaineers football